The 1993 Coppa Italia Final decided the winner of the 1992–93 Coppa Italia. It was held on 19 and 19 June 1993 between Torino and Roma.
Played over two legs, it ended 5–5 on aggregate, Torino won on the away goals rule. It was Torino's fifth victory.

First leg

Second leg

References
Coppa Italia 1992/93 statistics at rsssf.com

Coppa Italia Finals
Coppa Italia Final 1993
Coppa Italia Final 1993